The 2008 FIA GT San Luis 2 Hours was the tenth and final race of the 2008 FIA GT Championship season.  It took place at the new Potrero de los Funes Circuit in Argentina on 23 November 2008. It is the first time in FIA GT Championship history that an event has been held in South America.

Race results
Class winners in bold.  Cars failing to complete 75% of winner's distance marked as Not Classified (NC).

Statistics
 Pole Position – #5 Phoenix Carsport – 2:13.236
 Average Speed –

References

San Luis